Liliana Castillo Terreros (born 28 September 1976) is a Mexican politician affiliated with the PAN. She currently serves as Deputy of the LXII Legislature of the Mexican Congress representing Puebla. She took office on 16 July 2013 after Julio César Lorenzini left his seat.

References

1976 births
Living people
People from Mexico City
Women members of the Chamber of Deputies (Mexico)
National Action Party (Mexico) politicians
21st-century Mexican politicians
21st-century Mexican women politicians
Deputies of the LXII Legislature of Mexico
Members of the Chamber of Deputies (Mexico) for Puebla